Boss Film Studios was a prominent American visual effects company, founded by visual effects veteran Richard Edlund after his departure from Industrial Light and Magic, producing visual effects for over thirty films from 1983 to 1997. Before that period Edlund had worked at ILM on films like Raiders of the Lost Ark (1981) and the original Star Wars trilogy (1977-1983).

History
Boss Film Studios (originally Boss Film Corporation) initially undertook two projects, Ghostbusters (1984) and 2010, simultaneously. In an effort to set up the new venture quickly, Edlund acquired Douglas Trumbull's Entertainment Effects Group, taking over their Marina Del Rey facility.

Competition with ILM
Boss Film soon established itself as one of ILM's competitors as it contributed to such projects as Die Hard, Poltergeist II, and Big Trouble in Little China.

Edlund and his team chose to compete with ILM technically, continuing EEG's preference for using 65mm film for the creation of their optical effects work. This provided potentially cleaner effects than ILM's VistaVision format due to its much larger negative area.

Boss Game Studios
Boss Film branched out into video game production in 1994 through sister company Boss Game Studios. Boss Film also operated a commercial production company producing many television spots for companies including Budweiser, Dodge, United Airlines, and DHL.

Closure
Boss Film announced it was closing its doors on August 26, 1997, citing the difficulties of sustaining an independent effects house within the competitive environment at the time.

Awards
Nominated for the 1993 Academy Award for Best Visual Effects for Alien 3. The named nominees were Richard Edlund, Alec Gillis, Tom Woodruff Jr., and George Gibbs.
Nominated for the 1989 Academy Award for Best Visual Effects for Die Hard. The named nominees were Richard Edlund, Al Di Sarro, Brent Boates, and Thaine Morris.
Nominated for the 1987 Academy Award for Best Visual Effects for Poltergeist II. The named nominees were Richard Edlund, John Bruno, Garry Waller, and Bill Neil.
Boss Film was awarded a Scientific and Engineering Award from the AMPAS in 1987 for the design and development of a Zoom Aerial (ZAP) 65mm Optical Printer. The winners were Richard Edlund, Gene Whiteman, David Grafton, Mark West, Jerry Jeffress, and Robert Wilcox.
Nominated for the 1985 Academy Award for Best Visual Effects for both 2010 (Richard Edlund, Neil Krepela, George Jenson, and Mark Stetson) and Ghostbusters (Richard Edlund, John Bruno, Mark Vargo, and Chuck Gaspar).

Notable Boss Film alumni 

Brent Boates
John Bruno
Christian Colquhoun
Randall William Cook
Richard Edlund
Evan Jacobs
Greg Jein
Steve Johnson
Patrick McClung
Bill Neil
Jim Rygiel
Screaming Mad George
Stephen Stanton
Mark Stetson
David K. Stewart
Garry Waller
Terry Windell
Bruce MacRae

Facility location 
13335 Maxella Avenue, Marina Del Rey, CA 90292

Filmography 

1984
 Ghostbusters (credited as Effects Entertainment Group)
 2010 (credited as Effects Entertainment Group)

1985
 Fright Night

1986
 Big Trouble in Little China
 Poltergeist II: The Other Side
 Solarbabies
 Legal Eagles
 The Boy Who Could Fly

1987
 Masters of the Universe
 The Monster Squad
 Date with an Angel
 Leonard Part 6

1988
 Switching Channels
 Die Hard
 Vibes
 Twins
 Big Top Pee-wee

1989
 Tales from the Crypt series opening

1990
 The Hunt for Red October
 Ghost
 Solar Crisis

1992
 Alien 3
 Batman Returns
 Far and Away

1993
 Cliffhanger
 Last Action Hero
 Journey to Technopia

1994
 True Lies
 Drop Zone
 The Scout
 The Specialist
 Demon Knight

1995
 Outbreak
 Species
 Waterworld
 Heat
 Ace Ventura: When Nature Calls

1996
 Multiplicity

1997
 Turbulence
 Air Force One
 Starship Troopers

1998
 Desperate Measures

References

American animation studios
Computer animation
Special effects companies
Visual effects companies
Best Visual Effects Academy Award winners
Entertainment companies based in California
Companies based in Los Angeles County, California
Entertainment companies established in 1983
American companies disestablished in 1997
1983 establishments in California
1997 disestablishments in California
American companies established in 1983